Emmerich Bauer (24 October 1927 – 17 December 2020) was an Austrian weightlifter. He competed in the men's middleweight event at the 1952 Summer Olympics.

References

External links
 

1927 births
2020 deaths
Austrian male weightlifters
Olympic weightlifters of Austria
Weightlifters at the 1952 Summer Olympics
Place of birth missing